Olbia or Theodorias was a Roman / Byzantine town between Marj and Bayda in the Cyrenaica region of modern Libya. Olbia is now mostly the archaeological site. The location's modern name is Qasr Libya, after the Islamic period castle (Qasr) on the site and Libya or Lebia as a corruption of the ancient name Olbia.

History
The ancient city of Olbia, after destruction by the Vandals and incursions by Laguatan (Lwatae) nomads, was refounded in 539 CE as polis nea ("new city") Theodorias by the Byzantine empress Theodora.

All that remains of the town are two Byzantine churches. One is integrated into the Qasr, which now houses the Qasr Libya Museum. The other church was excavated by Richard Goodchild in the mid 1950s.
Only the floor plan remains, but fifty beautiful mosaic panels depicting the known world and the refoundation and adornment of the city by Theodora are on display in the museum. In one of these, two mosaics reveal the names of Makarios and Theodoros, the bishops, the latter being qualified as a "new bishop," presumably Makarios's successor.

Bishopric
There are five known ancient bishops of this ancient diocese. The first two are mentioned in the letter written by Synesius of Cyrene to Theophilus of Alexandria in 412, in which the author communicates to the Archbishop of Alexandria that after a long ministry and a long life died "the very best Father Athamas"; that the faithful of Olbia unanimously chose as his successor Antonios, an honest and just man. 

Bishop Publius took part in the Council of Ephesus 431.

Since 1933 Olbia has been included among the bishopric holders of the Catholic Church; the title is no longer assigned from May 26, 1978.

Known bishops

Late antiquity
 Athamas (fl. 412)
 Antonios (fl. after 412 )
 Poplios (Publius) (fl. 431)
 Makarios (fl. 539/540)
 Theodoros (fl. 539/540)

Modern times (Catholic Church)
 Tihamér Tóth (1938–1939)
 James Colbert (1939–1955)
 Elie Vandewalle (1958–1960)
 Arcângelo Cerqua (1961–1978)

Notes

References 
 Goodchild, Richard. The Great, newly discovered mosaic floor of Qasr el-Lebia. London Illustrated Evening News , Dec. 14th 1957
 Williams, Gwyn. Green Mountain - an informal guide to Cyrenaica and its Jebel Akhdar. Faber and Faber 1963

External links 
 Theodorias (Qasr Libya)

Archaeological sites in Libya
Roman sites in Libya
Former populated places in Libya
Ancient Cyrenaica
Populated places of the Byzantine Empire